Allans Flat is a small town in Victoria, Australia. It is located along Osbornes Flat Road, north-east of Yackandandah. The areas around the town were mined for gold between the 1850s and 1904 though without sufficient population for a Post Office until 26 October 1876.

The town was surveyed and proclaimed in 1905. The Post Office closed in 1975.

References

Towns in Victoria (Australia)
Shire of Indigo